Nobita (大雄) is an album by the Cantopop singer Leo Ku, released on July 31, 2004. The album is based on the main character in a Japanese manga Doraemon. The songs "Nobita" (大雄) and "Love and Honesty" (愛與誠) won Ku numerous awards in 2005.

Track listing 
Nobita (大雄)
Love and Honesty (愛與誠)
美雪, 美雪 
傷追人 
Touch 
The Biggest Comist Chaos (史上最強漫畫王大亂鬥)
小流氓 
飄流教室 
I'm Cat (我是貓) - Garfield Movie Theme Song (加菲貓電影主題曲)
Iron Man (鐵男)
Nobita [Happy Ending](大雄)

2004 albums